The Palace Laredo (Spanish: Palacete Laredo) is a palace located in Alcalá de Henares, Spain. It was declared Bien de Interés Cultural in 1975.

References 

Palaces in the Community of Madrid
Buildings and structures in Alcalá de Henares
Bien de Interés Cultural landmarks in the Community of Madrid